Star Fireworks is a British company that stages professional  fireworks displays and special effects for events. It specializes in providing choreographed firework sequences for film and television use. It was formed in 1971. It was known as Bracknell Fireworks until the name of the company was changed in 2005. Its main offices are in Bracknell, Berkshire.

Notable clients
Star Fireworks has become well known for its fireworks and special effects for the UK version of the reality television show Big Brother.  It has fired finale fireworks for every Big Brother series at Elstree Studios since 2002.

Awards
In 2013, Star Fireworks won the British Firework Championships Champion of Champions competition in Plymouth, Devon, in which previous winners from the past six years are invited to compete. The company was also crowned British Champions in 2010. In 2008, they won the British Firework Championships Northern heat in Salford, Greater Manchester and placed second in the main competition. The company has also won or been runner-up in various other UK firework competitions.

Professional memberships and associations
Star Fireworks are members of the British Pyrotechnists Association (BPA). The company directors are Members of the Institute of Explosives Engineers.

Representation of the UK fireworks industry
Company staff are noted for their heavy involvement in representing the UK professional fireworks display industry in the UK and in Europe. Andy Hubble, a director of Star Fireworks, used to be a consultant and media representative to the British Government's former Department of Trade and Industry (DTI), on its firework safety campaign, from 1995 to 2005. He chaired the British Pyrotechnists Association from 2008 to 2010 and a second term from 2013 to 2016, sitting on various Government committees concerning professional fireworks and explosives safety and control in the UK. Andy has sat on the Council of the Institute of Explosives Engineers since 2016. He has represented UK interests as part of a multi-national team producing harmonized firework regulations across the EU sitting on the European Committee for Standardization (CEN) Technical Committee for Category 4 Fireworks (professional fireworks). He is also a regular columnist for Fireworks (magazine) magazine and the Journal of the Institute of Explosives Engineers.

In 2013 Star Fireworks took action when changes in the European Pyrotechnic Directive threatened their business and others with closure, gaining the support of local Member of Parliament (MP) Dr Phillip Lee and the Consumer Affairs Minister Jo Swinson MP who, with the industry, found a solution to the problem.

References

External links
 Official Fireworks Display Website
 Official Fireworks for sale Website

Pyrotechnics
1971 establishments in England
Entertainment companies established in 1971
Fireworks companies
Manufacturing companies of the United Kingdom
Companies based in Bracknell
Chemical companies established in 1971